The 2000 Grote Prijs Jef Scherens was the 34th edition of the Grote Prijs Jef Scherens cycle race and was held on 3 September 2000. The race started and finished in Leuven. The race was won by Dave Bruylandts.

General classification

References

2000
2000 in road cycling
2000 in Belgian sport